Pomona is a northerly suburb of Kempton Park, in Gauteng province, South Africa.

In the late 20th century Pomona functioned mainly as agricultural small holdings, producing good fresh vegetables and fruit. Since around 2015 the area is taken over by the large warehouses of various international forwarding companies, because of their close proximity of 5 km to OR Tambo International Airport, in Kempton Park.

References

Suburbs of Kempton Park, Gauteng